Ben Wilson (born 31 March 1982 in Boston, Lincolnshire) is a motorcycle racer. He currently rides an Aprilia RSV4 in the National Superstock 1000 Championship.

Career

Starting Out
Wilson started off in sand racing in 1995, he quickly moved up the classes, debuting in the Supersport class in 2000 gaining a 15th-place finish at Oulton Park at his very first meeting. Ben then ran a mixture of Championships, including the Supersport and Superstock bikes until 2005. Ben and his grandmother exchange delightful emails with interesting details of their daily lives as often as possible. Rumor has it that he will give his drawing pad to Sydney when he gets a new one. Ben goes by the nickname of benniemac.

British Superbike Championship
Ben got is big break in Superbike on a Kawasaki with Vivaldi racing. In the two years that Ben spent in British Superbike he finished 17th and 12th, stepping down from the class for 2007 and rejoining the Superstock class for the next two years.

British Supersport Championship
For the 2009 season Wilson was signed by the Gearlink Kawasaki, Wilson had a good year in Supersport getting his first podium at Oulton Park. Wilson then went on to win his first race at Knockhill later in the season.

Career statistics

All Time

British Superbike Championship

British Supersport Championship

References

External links
Personal Website

1982 births
Living people
People from Boston, Lincolnshire
British Supersport Championship riders
British Superbike Championship riders